Sergey Kovalevsky (born 6 January 1970) is a Belarusian wrestler. He competed in the men's freestyle 100 kg at the 1996 Summer Olympics.

References

External links
 

1970 births
Living people
Belarusian male sport wrestlers
Olympic wrestlers of Belarus
Wrestlers at the 1996 Summer Olympics
Sportspeople from Khabarovsk
20th-century Belarusian people